The Robert F. Wagner Graduate School of Public Service is the public policy school of New York University in New York City, New York. The school is named after New York City former mayor Robert F. Wagner Jr. in 1989.

History 

In 1938, NYU offered its first Master of Public Administration (MPA) degree in response to overfilled public service-oriented classes at the university. Fifteen years later, NYU established a stand-alone school—the School for Public Service and Social Work. At around the same time, Robert Ferdinand Wagner Jr., as Mayor of New York City, worked to build public housing and schools, and established the right for city employees to collectively bargain. Wagner also made housing discrimination based on race, creed, or color illegal in New York City. In 1989, NYU renamed the school the Robert F. Wagner Graduate School of Public Service in honor of the three-term mayor after receiving a major donation from the Wagner family.

In 2004, NYU Wagner relocated to the Puck Building, a New York City landmark in the city's SoHo neighborhood.

Academics 
The school offers the following degrees:

 Master of Public Administration (MPA) in public and nonprofit management and policy
 Master of Public Administration in health policy and management
 Master of Healthcare Administration (MHA)
 Master of Urban Planning (MUP)
 Master of Science in Public Policy (MSPP)
 Executive Master of Public Administration (EMPA)
 Doctor of Philosophy (PhD) in public administration

NYU Wagner also offers joint degree programs with the NYU School of Law, NYU Stern School of Business, NYU School of Medicine, the Skirball Department of Hebrew and Judaic Studies, the NYU College of Arts and Science, and the NYU College of Global Public Health.

The school operates several research centers, institutes, and initiatives.

Programs 
In addition to offerings in the NYU Wagner course listings, students are eligible to cross-register for many courses at the other graduate and professional schools at NYU.

NYU Wagner offers the following Undergraduate Minors in partnership with several New York University schools:
 Social Entrepreneurship
 Public Policy and Management
 Social and Public Policy
 Multifaith and Spiritual Leadership
Combined Bachelor's and master's degree programs at NYU Wagner allow students to complete undergraduate and graduate degrees in five years instead of the traditional six. Combined dual-degree BA-MPA programs include:
 BA-MPA with NYU Abu Dhabi
 BA-MPA with NYU College of Arts and Science
 BA-MPA with NYU Gallatin School of Individualized Study
 BA-MPA with NYU Global Liberal Studies
The BA-MUP with the College of Arts and Science allows New York University undergraduates majoring in Economics, International Relations, Metropolitan Studies, Politics, Sociology, or Urban Design and Architecture who have completed most of their undergraduate degrees to take graduate courses and receive the Master's in Urban Planning.

The BA-MUP with the NYU Tandon School of Engineering allows New York University Tandon undergraduates majoring in Sustainable Urban Environments, Construction Management, or Civil Engineering who have earned a GPA of 3.0 or higher to take graduate courses and receive the Master's in Urban Planning.

Capstone Project 
All MPA and MUP students are required to complete a team-based Capstone project where they turn their classroom learning into practice to help nonprofit, public, and private sector organizations tackle a critical challenge.

Notable current and former NYU Wagner faculty
 Alan Altshuler, Massachusetts Secretary of Transportation (1972-1975)
 Doug Band, founding partner and president of Teneo (2011- )
 Thad Calabrese, founder of The Austerity Program (1997-)
 Jorge Castañeda, Mexican Secretary of Foreign Affairs (2000-2003)
 Dalton Conley, sociologist and Guggenheim Fellow (2011)
 Harold Ford Jr., member of the U.S. House of Representatives from Tennessee's 9th district (1997-2007)
 Sherry Glied, professor of public service, and dean
 Eric Klinenberg, public sociologist and scholar of urban studies, culture, and media
 Jim Knickman, president and CEO of the New York State Health Foundation (2006-2016)
 Gara LaMarche, president of the Democracy Alliance (2013- )
 Jacob Lew, 76th United States Secretary of the Treasury (2013-2017)
 Timothy Naftali, historian and former director of the Tamiment Library and Robert F. Wagner Archives at New York University (2014-2015) and the Richard Nixon Presidential Library and Museum (2007-2011)
 Jonathan Morduch, development economist and executive director of the Financial Access Initiative (2006- )
 Victor G. Rodwin, co-director of the World Cities Project. 
 Robert Shrum, political consultant for Al Gore and John Kerry (1986-2004)
 Martha Stark, commissioner of the New York City Department of Finance (2002-2009)

Notable NYU Wagner Alumni 
For a comprehensive list of NYU Wagner and New York University alumni, please refer to the List of New York University People.
 Chelsea Clinton, Vice Chair of the Clinton Foundation (2011- ), daughter of U.S. President Bill Clinton and U.S. Secretary of State Hillary Clinton
Carol Thompson Cole, President and CEO of Venture Philanthropy Partners (2007- )
 Tom Coleman, Missouri Congressman (1976-1993)
 Maria Comella, Chief of Staff to Governor Andrew M. Cuomo of New York (2017-2018)
 Christopher Constantino, Executive Director of Elmhurst Hospital Center (2014- )
 Elvis S. Cordova, Acting Under Secretary at U.S. Department of Agriculture (2016-2017)
Lorraine Cortés-Vázquez, former Secretary of State of New York
 Alina Das, Associate Professor of Clinical Law and Supervising Attorney at New York University School of Law (2014- )
 Miguel Fuentes, President and CEO of Bronx-Lebanon Hospital (1987- )
 Amal Hamad Farhan, Senator of the Upper House of the Hashemite Kingdom of Jordan (2009-2011)
 Spiridon Hatiras, CEO of Holyoke Medical Center (2013- )
 Masayuki Ito, Advisor to the Mayor of Maebashi City, Japan
 Jennifer Jones Austin, CEO of Federation of Protestant Welfare Agencies (2006- )
 Melissa Kajunju, President and CEO of the Africa-America Institute (2012- )
 Melissa Kushner, Founder of Yamba Malawi (2016- )
 Nhadine Leung, Chief of Staff for Girl Scouts of the USA (2012- )
Shola Olatoye, CEO of the New York City Housing Authority (2014-2018)
 Derek Bryson Park, Director of the Federal Home Loan Bank of New York (1999-2002), Commissioner of the New York City Commission on Human Rights (2000-2014)
 Michael Pavia, Mayor of Stamford, CT (2009-2013)
 Gary Rodney, President of the New York City Housing Development Corporation (2014-2016)
 Shelley Frost Rubin, Co-founder and Co-chair of the Rubin Museum of Art (2004- )
 Mehmet Saglam, Vice Chair of the EU-Turkey Joint Parliamentary Committee (2007-2015)
 Chris Shays, Connecticut Congressman (1987-2009)
 Amit M. Shelat, Vice Chairman of the New York State Board for Medicine, Office of the Professions, New York State Education Department   (2018-  )
 Cynthia Sparer, Executive Director of Yale-New Haven Children's Hospital (2011- )
 Branford Tait, Senate President of the Barbados Parliament (2008-2012)
 Zachary Townsend, inaugural Chief Data Officer of California (2016- )
 Jeremy Travis, President of John Jay College of Criminal Justice (2004- )
 Hope Tumukunde, Ambassador of the Republic of Rwanda to Ethiopia (2015- )
 Javier Valdés, Co-Executive Director of Make The Road New York (2013- )
 Alan Van Capelle, CEO of Educational Alliance (2014- )
 RuthAnne Visnauskas, Commissioner and CEO of New York State Homes and Community Renewal (2017- )
 Maria T. Vullo, Superintendent of Financial Services for the State of New York (2016- )
 Iris Weinshall, COO of The New York Public Library (2014- )
 John White, Superintendent of the Louisiana Department of Education (2012- )

References

External links 
 

New York University schools
Public administration schools in the United States
Public policy schools
Educational institutions established in 1938
1938 establishments in New York City